The Diocese of Batticaloa is a Roman Catholic diocese for south-eastern Sri Lanka. The current bishop is Joseph Ponniah.

History 
The Diocese of Batticaloa was created on 3 July 2012 from parts of the Diocese of Trincomalee-Batticaloa. First and oldest church of this diocese is Church of Our Lady of Presentation.

Parishes and Churches 
It has 19 parishes in Batticaloa deanery and 7 in Kalmunai deanery. It has 7 shrines such as St. Antony's shrine (Puliyanthivu), Our Lady of Fátima shrine (Inginiyagala), Our Lady of the Rosary shrine (Periya Pullumalai), Our Lady of Perpetual Help shrine (Aayithiyamalai), Our Lady of Little Lourdes shrine (Navatkudah), Holy Cross shrine (Sorikkalmunai) and St. Judas Thaddaeus shrine (Thettathivu).

Bishops

References

External links
 Diocese of Batticaloa

 
Organisations based in Eastern Province, Sri Lanka
Christian organizations established in 2012
Batticaloa